Clayton Murphy (born February 26, 1995) is an American middle-distance runner. He won the bronze medal in the 800-meter run at the 2016 Olympic Games. He was the gold medalist in the 800-meter run at the 2015 Pan American Games. He ran collegiately for the University of Akron, before signing with Nike in June 2016 and joining the Nike Oregon Project.

Early life and education

Clayton Murphy is the son of Mark and Melinda Murphy. He was raised in New Madison, Ohio. He attended Tri-Village High School  and began to take part in track and field and cross country running while there. Murphy broke the Division III state record in the 1600 Meter Run at the 2013 state track meet in Columbus in 4:11.72.

Collegiate career

2014
Murphy enrolled at the University of Akron in fall 2013. He began to train with the Akron Zips college track team. There he was coached by the head distance coach, Lee LaBadie, who is a sub 4-minute miler and a former runner for the University of Illinois. At the 2014 Mid-American Conference (MAC) indoor meet, Murphy won the mile run and was runner-up over 3000 meters. He went on to win the outdoor conference title in the 1500 meters. He ran 3:44.53 for the distance that year to win the Mt. SAC Relays.

2015
He opened the following academic year (2014–15) with a fourth-place finish at the MAC Cross Country Championships, then followed this with an 800 m/mile double at the MAC Indoor meet. In February he ran a personal best and school record of 4:00.39 minutes for the indoor mile run. On his national debut at the 2015 NCAA Division I Indoor Track and Field Championships he claimed third place in the 800 m with a new best time of 1:47.06 minutes. Similar results came outdoors, as he won a middle-distance double at the MAC Outdoor Championships and again placed third at the 2015 NCAA Division I Outdoor Track and Field Championships. He also won the 800 m at the Drake Relays and set a school record of 3:40.69 for the 1500 m.

He placed well the following academic year (2015–16) with a 4th place at Mid American Conference Championships in Cross Country and twentieth place at 2015 NCAA Division I Great Lakes Region Cross Country Championships. Murphy won 2016 Mid-American Conference Indoor Track & Field Championships titles in Distance medley relay, 4x400 m relay, Mile, and 800 metres. Murphy won 2016 NCAA Division I Indoor Track and Field Championships in 800 metres. Murphy won 2016 Mid-American Conference Outdoor Track & Field Championships titles in 1500 metres and 800 metres. Murphy won 1500 m at 2016 NCAA Division I Outdoor Track and Field Championships in 3:36.38.

Murphy won 12 Mid-American Conference titles, NCAA Division I 2016 Indoor 800 m title, NCAA Division I 2016 Outdoor 1500 m title and earned 4 NCAA Division I All-American awards.

National and international career
At the end of the college season, he entered the 2015 USA Outdoor Track and Field Championships. He ran personal records in each round and ended the competition in fourth place with a time of 1:45.59 for the 800m. This earned him selection for the American squad for the Pan American Games. In his international debut – also his first time abroad – he surprised by winning the gold medal some four hundredths ahead of Colombia's Rafith Rodríguez, taking the lead in the final stretch. Murphy's roommate Ryan Martin was also a medalist in the event. Murphy was the first American in more than 15 years to win the title, following on from Johnny Gray's 1999 victory. He earned a silver medal in the 800 meters at the 2015 North American, Central American and Caribbean Championships. This edition, 2015 NACAC Championships were a regional track and field competition held at the Estadio Nacional de Costa Rica in San Jose, Costa Rica from August 7–9, 2015. Murphy finished 12th in 2015 World Championships in Athletics – Men's 800 metres held August 21–25, 2015 in Beijing, China.

He chose to run the 800 meters at the 2016 United States Olympic Trials, which paid off.  His fast finish out-sprinted Boris Berian for the win and Olympic team berth in a personal record 1:44.76. He won Bronze in the 800m at the 2016 Rio Olympics in a new personal record of 1:42.93, the fifth-fastest time ever by an American.

At the 2017 USATF 1 Mile Road Championships, Murphy finished first with a time of 4:00.0. He chose to compete in the 800 meters at the 2017 USA Outdoor Track and Field Championships then compete in the 1500 meters at the same championships and ran 1:45.70 to make the final, but did not start in the 800 meters final after an injury in the 1500 meters final where he finished in 3:50.55 to place 13th in the 1500 meters. He joined Nike Oregon Project in August 2017 and moved to Portland in the Fall 2017 to train at the Nike headquarters with Matthew Centrowitz, the Rio Olympic gold medalist over 1500m.

2021
Murphy won the 2020 Olympic Trials 800m in 1:43.17 to make his second Olympic team.

International results

Personal life
Murphy met fellow Olympian Ariana Washington over a game of Uno at the USA Track and Field Athletes Lounge in the Olympic Village at the 2016 Summer Games in Rio. They got engaged in 2018, and were married in the Napa Valley on December 7, 2019.

See also
List of 2015 Pan American Games medal winners

References

External links

1995 births
Living people
Track and field athletes from Ohio
People from Preble County, Ohio
American male middle-distance runners
Pan American Games track and field athletes for the United States
Pan American Games gold medalists for the United States
Pan American Games medalists in athletics (track and field)
Athletes (track and field) at the 2015 Pan American Games
Akron Zips men's cross country runners
Akron Zips men's track and field athletes
World Athletics Championships athletes for the United States
Athletes (track and field) at the 2016 Summer Olympics
Olympic bronze medalists for the United States in track and field
Medalists at the 2016 Summer Olympics
American members of the Church of the Brethren
Olympic male middle-distance runners
People from Greenville, Ohio
People from New Madison, Ohio
USA Outdoor Track and Field Championships winners
USA Indoor Track and Field Championships winners
Medalists at the 2015 Pan American Games
Athletes (track and field) at the 2020 Summer Olympics